Lezhnevo or Lezhnyovo is the name of several inhabited localities in Russia.

Urban localities
Lezhnevo, Ivanovo Oblast, a settlement in Lezhnevsky District of Ivanovo Oblast

Rural localities
Lezhnevo, Antropovsky District, Kostroma Oblast, a selo in Kotelnikovskoye Settlement of Antropovsky District of Kostroma Oblast
Lezhnevo, Kostromskoy District, Kostroma Oblast, a village in Serednyakovskoye Settlement of Kostromskoy District of Kostroma Oblast
Lezhnevo, Pskov Oblast, a village in Pushkinogorsky District of Pskov Oblast
Lezhnevo, Kashinsky District, Tver Oblast, a village in Kashinsky District, Tver Oblast
Lezhnevo, Likhoslavlsky District, Tver Oblast, a village in Likhoslavlsky District, Tver Oblast
Lezhnevo, Ostashkovsky District, Tver Oblast, a village in Ostashkovsky District, Tver Oblast
Lezhnevo, Staritsky District, Tver Oblast, a village in Staritsky District, Tver Oblast

See also
Lezhnevsky (disambiguation)